Bamforth is a surname. Notable people with the surname include:

Adrian Bamforth, British comic book artist
Charles Bamforth (born 1952), British scientist
Nicholas Bamforth, British legal scholar
Rosemary Bamforth (1924-2018), Scottish pathologist 
Scott Bamforth (born 1989), American-Kosovan basketball player
Vic Bamforth (born 1952), British glass artist